The Texas Tornado is a 1932 pre-Code American Western film directed by Oliver Drake and starring Lane Chandler, Doris Hill and Ben Corbett.

Cast
 Lane Chandler as Tex Robbins - Posing as Wolf Cassidy 
 Doris Hill as Ruth O'Byrne 
 Ben Corbett as Texas Ranger Shorty Walker 
 J. Frank Glendon as Three Star Henley 
 Edward Hearn as Fanner Durkin 
 Yakima Canutt as Jackson - Henchman 
 Bartlett A. Carre as Slim - O'Byrne Ranch Cook 
 Wes Warner as Pete - Henchman 
 Fred Burns as Sheriff 
 Slim Whitaker as Henchman 
 Mike Brand as Wolf Cassidy

References

Bibliography
 Pitts, Michael R. Western Movies: A Guide to 5,105 Feature Films. McFarland, 2012.

External links
 
 
 
 
 
 

1932 films
1932 Western (genre) films
American black-and-white films
American Western (genre) films
Films directed by Oliver Drake
1930s English-language films
1930s American films